Ada Maddocks (22 September 1927–7 March 2007) was a British trade union official.

Born in Felixstowe, Maddocks grew up in Walthamstow and was educated at Walthamstow County High School before working in a laboratory for the Co-operative Wholesale Society.  She became active in the co-operative movement, then began working for the National and Local Government Officers Association in 1961.  In 1976, she assumed lead responsibility for health service employees in the union, and was elected to one of two women-only seats on the General Council of the Trades Union Congress.  She was awarded an OBE in 1982, and served as President of the Trades Union Congress in 1990, actively supporting the ambulance workers' strike.  She retired in 1992.

References

1927 births
2007 deaths
British trade unionists
Members of the General Council of the Trades Union Congress
People from Felixstowe
People from Walthamstow
Presidents of the Trades Union Congress
People educated at Walthamstow School for Girls